Sophronica rufobasiantennalis is a species of beetle in the family Cerambycidae. It was described by Stephan von Breuning in 1948. It contains the varietas Sophronica rufobasiantennalis var. ovalis.

References

Sophronica
Beetles described in 1948